Honky is a 1971 romance film directed by William Graham that depicts the love story of an interracial high school couple.

Synopsis
It depicts the love story of an interracial high school couple. The tagline for the movie was "A love story... of hate". It was nominated for a Golden Globe for Best Original Song for "Something More" by Quincy Jones and Bradford Craig.

Cast
 Brenda Sykes as Sheila Smith
 John Neilson as Wayne "Honky" Devine
 William Marshall as Dr. Craig Smith
 Maia Danziger as Sharon
 Marion Ross as Mrs. Divine
 John Lasell as Archer Divine
 Lincoln Kilpatrick as Fabulous Traveling Shoes
 Jake Mannion and Harriet Gardiner of H.W.A also featured as themselves.

Reviews
The film received mixed reviews. The New York Times writer Howard Thompson began his review by saying "Honky is awful".

TV Guide called the film ""Socially relevant" at the time, now just an overblown, clichéd anachronism, HONKY details an interracial relationship between young white man Nielson and rich black girl Sykes."

See also
 List of American films of 1971

References

External links
 
 

1971 films
1971 romantic drama films
American independent films
American romantic drama films
1970s English-language films
Films scored by Quincy Jones
Films about interracial romance
Films about drugs
Films shot in Missouri
Films directed by William Graham (director)
1971 independent films
1970s American films